Robert Corfou (born 2 December 1942) is a French football manager and former player. He was the manager of the Republic of the Congo national team. He has previously held positions with the Cameroon and Ivory Coast national football teams.

He played for Entente BFN (and previously CS Fontainebleau).

He has previously been a regional Technical director for the France national team.

Notes

References

1942 births
Living people
Sportspeople from Charente-Maritime
French footballers
Footballers from Nouvelle-Aquitaine
Association football defenders
Ligue 2 players
Championnat de France Amateur (1935–1971) players
RCP Fontainebleau players
Entente Bagneaux-Fontainebleau-Nemours players
French football managers
Expatriate football managers in Cameroon
Cameroon national football team managers
Expatriate football managers in Ivory Coast
Ivory Coast national football team managers
Expatriate football managers in the Republic of the Congo
Congo national football team managers
French expatriate sportspeople in the Republic of the Congo